Pseudomonacanthus is a genus in the filefishes native to the Indian and western Pacific oceans.

Species
There are currently 4 recognized species in this genus:
 Pseudomonacanthus elongatus Fraser-Brunner, 1940 (Fourband leatherjacket)
 Pseudomonacanthus macrurus (Bleeker, 1857) (Strap-weed filefish)
 Pseudomonacanthus peroni (Hollard, 1854) (Pot-bellied leatherjacket)
 Pseudomonacanthus tweediei Fraser-Brunner, 1940

References

Monacanthidae
Taxa named by Pieter Bleeker
Marine fish genera